Isabelle Turcotte Baird (born September 24, 1970 in Quebec City, Quebec) is an athlete from Canada.  She competes in the triathlon.

Baird competed at the first Olympic triathlon at the 2000 Summer Olympics. She took thirty-first place with a total time of 2:08:29.49.

References
sports-reference

1970 births
Living people
Canadian female triathletes
French Quebecers
Sportspeople from Quebec City
Triathletes at the 1999 Pan American Games
Pan American Games competitors for Canada
Triathletes at the 2000 Summer Olympics
Olympic triathletes of Canada
Laval Rouge et Or athletes
21st-century Canadian women